Itinerary of a Spoiled Child or Itinéraire d'un enfant gâté is a French film directed by Claude Lelouch in 1988.

Synopsis
A foundling, raised in the circus, Sam Lion becomes a businessman after a trapeze accident. However, when he reaches fifty and becomes tired of his responsibilities and of his son Jean-Philippe, he decides to disappear at sea. However, he runs into Albert Duvivier, one of his former employees. He comes to realise that he has ignored the important things in his life.

Details
 Title : Itinéraire d'un enfant gâté
 Director: Claude Lelouch
 Writer : Claude Lelouch
 Length: 125 minutes
 Music : Francis Lai
 Producers: Jean-Paul Belmondo and Claude Lelouch
 Country : France
 Format : Colour (Eastmancolor) - 1.85:1 (Vistavision) - Dolby digital sound -  35mm
 Genre : drama/adventure/comedy
 Release: 30

Starring
Jean-Paul Belmondo as Sam Lion
Richard Anconina as Albert Duvivier
Marie-Sophie L. as Victoria Lion
Jean-Philippe Chatrier as Jean-Philippe Lion
Lio as Yvette
Daniel Gélin as Pierre Duvivier
Béatrice Agenin as Corinne
Michel Beaune as Lawyer Vergne
Pierre Vernier as The monk
Gila von Weitershausen
Sabine Haudepin
Pierre Leroux as the Barman of Bel Air Hotel (uncredited)
Arthur Brauss

Reception
The film had admissions in France of 3,254,100.

Awards
César for best actor for Jean-Paul Belmondo 1989
 Prize for best actor at the Chicago Film Festival for Richard Anconina

References

External links 
 
Itinerary of a spoilt child at Le Film Guide

French comedy-drama films
1988 films
Films directed by Claude Lelouch
Circus films
Films shot in Zimbabwe
Films shot in Paris
Films shot in California
Films shot in Germany
Films scored by Francis Lai
1980s French films
Films shot in French Polynesia